Made or MADE may refer to:

Entertainment

Film
Made (1972 film), United Kingdom 
Made (2001 film), United States

Music
Made (Big Bang album), 2016
Made (Hawk Nelson album), 2013
Made (Scarface album), 2007
M.A.D.E., 2003 album by Memphis Bleek
"Made" (Scuba Dice song), 2006
"Made" (The Wanted song), 2010
Made (band), a Toronto lo-fi band

Television
Made (TV series), United States, 2002 to 2014

Companies
Made.com, an online furniture retailer in London, United Kingdom
MADE Clothing, an American clothing line around 2005
The MADE or The Museum of Art and Digital Entertainment

Geography
Made (Netherlands), a town in the Netherlands

People
van der Made - Dutch family name
Dalem Di Made (fl. 1623–1642), Balinese king
Ida Bagus Made (1915–1999), Balinese painter
Joseph Made, Zimbabwean politician
Sacco van der Made (1918–1997), Dutch actor and voice actor
Simon van Groenewegen van der Made (1613–1652), Dutch jurist
Tilly van der Made (born 1938), Dutch runner

Other uses
Made man, a fully initiated member of the American mafia